South Drain may refer to:

South Drain (river), a river in Somerset, England
South Drain, Suriname, a town in Suriname